Turkish Springs in Stari Ledinci are one of the last traces of the Ottoman Empire period architecture in norther Serbian region of Vojvodina. The areas north of Sava and Danube river, which at the time were part of Ottoman Hungary, were reconquered by the Habsburg monarchy already at the end of the Great Turkish War and the signing of the 1699 Treaty of Karlowitz, significantly before the independence of the Principality of Serbia, which led to preservation of significantly lesser number of artefacts from the Ottoman period in the region. Springs still standing in the village were reconstructed in 1842 and another one in 1885. Today, both springs are protected cultural monuments.

Systematic demolition of all symbols of Islam happened in the late 17th century after the region of southern Ottoman Hungary was reconquered by the Habsburg monarchy with the practice less all encompassing at future stages of what some called the Balkan Reconquista.

See also
 Rumelia
 Sanjak of Syrmia
 Ottoman monuments of Ilok
 Ottoman Serbia

References

Buildings and structures of the Ottoman Empire
Buildings and structures in Vojvodina
Ottoman architecture in Serbia
Ottoman history of Vojvodina